Nico Semsrott (born 11 March 1986) is a German Kabarett artist, slam poet, and politician. He was elected as a Member of the European Parliament in 2019 as a member of Die PARTEI, but left the party in 2021, and sits as an independent.

Career

Entertainment
In school, he founded the satirical school newspaper Sophie's Underworld together with his younger brother,  at the Hamburg . Its sale was banned on the school grounds by the school's headmistress, though it was continued to be sold from a portable toilet.

Since 2008, Semsrott has portrayed a depressive persona on poetry slams and cabarets. He usually introduces himself to the audience as a “demotivational speaker”. This was also a profession on the ballot for the 2019 European elections.

His first solo show, titled "Joy is just a lack of information", premiered on 14 June 2012 in Hamburg. He performed updated versions from Autumn 2014 until Christmas 2018. In 2019, Semsrott announced a pause in favor of his political work. Semsrott was part of the ZDF heute-show team from 2017 until 2019, hosting the segment No Fun Facts.

Politics
Semsrott ran in the 2017 German federal election as leading candidate for Berlin for Die PARTEI, a satirical German political party, receiving 2.1% of the votes.

In the 2019 European elections, Semsrott was elected to the European Parliament as the second party-list candidate (behind Martin Sonneborn) from Die PARTEI. His party received 2.4%. Unlike other elections in Germany, there is no 5% electoral threshold concerning the European Parliament elections. In the preelection Semsrott criticized the lack of attention given to younger generations in a TV advertisement. A survey made after the election showed that votes for Die PARTEI came especially from first-time voters (about 9% of this group), who cast more votes for it than for the SPD or the FDP, two establishment parties.

In May 2020 Semsrott revealed a series of thefts in the European Parliament. He has published a video about the incidents on his YouTube channel, where he criticizes the way the security staff was handling the investigation. He also published a timeline of the thefts and measures that were taken by him on his website. On 13 January 2021 he announced his party membership resignation from Die PARTEI after heavy controversies and accusations of racism and blackfacing aroused around the federal chairman Martin Sonneborn. Semsrott is going to continue his mandate in the European Parliament as an independent member of parliament.

Awards 
 2009: Winner NDR-Comedy Contest
 2010: Karl-Marx-Poesie-Preis
 2011: Stuttgarter Besen, audience award
 2011: Kleines Passauer Scharfrichterbeil (3rd place)
 2011: Winner NDR-Comedy Contest
 2012: Die Freiburger Leiter
 2014: Bayerischer Kabarettpreis, Senkrechtstarter
 2017: Deutscher Kleinkunstpreis, category cabaret

References

External links 

 
 Videos by and about Nico Semsrott on the AV-Portal of the Technischen Informationsbibliothek

1986 births
Living people
German cabaret performers
Slam poets
MEPs for Germany 2019–2024
Die PARTEI MEPs